

The Constitution of the Republic of South Africa 

The Constitution of the Republic of South Africa Act, No. 108 of 1996 is the piece of legislation against which each prior piece of legislation must be judged and if necessary be amended, and it is backdrop which has coloured each subsequent piece of legislation promulgated.

It was negotiated after the collapse of the race-based apartheid government and the political redefinition of South Africa.  During the negotiations around this change the Interim Constitution of the Republic of South Africa Act, No. 200 of 1993 held the fort, as it were, until the final Constitution of the Republic of South Africa, 1996, was negotiated and promulgated. The Interim Constitution was repealed by the Constitution of the Republic of South Africa, 1996.

The Constitution of the Republic of South Africa holds the all important Bill of Rights, sets up the administrative, judicial and political systems and structures, defines provincial and municipal systems and structures, provides for the passing of laws to necessary to enforce aspects of the Constitution, and sets up institutions such as the Human Rights Commission, which are necessary to safeguard the ideals contained in the Constitution.

The Constitution of the Republic of South Africa Act, 1996, is very much the torch held up by the population of South Africans as the light to guide them. However, there has increasingly been an increasing number of challenges to the Constitution and institutions it set up, such as the Constitutional Court and the South African Human Rights Commission ("SAHRC").

These challenges have emanated from within the ruling party, the African National Congress ("ANC"), and its two allies, the huge labour confederation the Congress of South African Trade Unions ("COSATU"), and the South African Communist Party ("SACP"). For example, the Constitutional Court was recently referred to as "counter-revolutionary" by the Secretary-General of the ANC, and the HRC's order that the leader of the ANC Youth Brigade apologise for statements that he would kill to protect the President of the ANC, Mr Jacob Zuma, from what he considered to be an unfair legal process into corruption charges against Mr Zuma, was largely ignored, as were supporting statements by and a similar order in relation to the leader of COSATU and the SACP.

Other South African Legislation
Aside from national legislation, South Africa also has provincial legislation, and local government legislation (often called "by-laws").

Provincial legislation
South Africa's nine provinces each produce a number of statutes a year, in areas for which they have either concurrent, or exclusive, legislative competence under section 104 of the Constitution of the Republic of South Africa Act, 1996. (See Schedule 4 of the Constitution for a list of the functions areas in respect of which a province may legislate).

Local government legislation
South Africa's municipalities may, in terms of the Constitution of the Republic of South Africa, 1996, make by-laws for the effective administration of the matters it has a right to administer.  The areas within which a municipality may make by-laws are listed in Schedule 4 Part B, and Schedule 5 Part B, of the Constitution.

External links
 South African Government documents — Includes Constitution, Acts and legislative bills

Politics of South Africa
Main